The Veterans Memorial Dam (National ID # VA137001), also known as the Lake of the Woods Main Dam, is an earth-fill embankment dam on the Flat Run located  west of Fredericksburg, Virginia.

The dam was constructed in 1968 with the primary purpose of recreation. Surrounding its reservoir is the resort community of Lake of the Woods.  The Lake of the Woods Association owns the dam.

References

Buildings and structures in Orange County, Virginia
Dams in Virginia
Earth-filled dams
Dams completed in 1968